The 1908 Chicago Cubs season was the 37th season of the Chicago Cubs franchise, the 33rd in the National League, and the 16th at West Side Park. It involved the Cubs winning their 3rd consecutive National League pennant, as well as the World Series. 
This team included four future Hall of Famers: manager / first baseman Frank Chance, second baseman Johnny Evers, shortstop Joe Tinker, and pitcher Mordecai Brown. In 1908, Brown finished second in the NL in wins and earned run average. This would be the last World Series victory for the Cubs until the 2016 World Series.

Regular season

Season summary 

The Cubs started the season in Cincinnati. Orval Overall was the Cubs' Opening Day starting pitcher. Overall gave up five hits and committed an error in the first inning as the Reds took a 5–0 lead. The Cubs tied the game in the sixth and won the game in the ninth. Cubs pinch hitter Heinie Zimmerman drove in Johnny Evers. Mordecai "Three Finger" Brown pitched in the ninth and got a save for the Cubs.

The home opener was on April 22. Owner Charles Murphy had added several new seats to the stadium. Long-time Cub player-manager Cap Anson threw out the first pitch. Tinker, Evers, and Chance turned their second double play of the season as the Cubs beat the Reds by a score of 7–3.

On June 30, the Pittsburgh Pirates took first place, as the Cubs lost to the Cincinnati Reds. Starting on July 2, the Pirates started a critical five game series against the Cubs. In the first game, Three Finger Brown threw a six hit, no walk shutout, winning the game 3–0. Brown was 10–1 on the season.

On September 26, starting pitcher Ed Reulbach became the only pitcher in Major League Baseball history to pitch two shutouts on the same day.  That day, the Cubs played a doubleheader against the Brooklyn Dodgers.  Reulbach pitched both games to completion, which the Cubs won by scores of 5–0 and 3–0.

The Merkle Game 
On Wednesday, September 23, 1908, while playing for the New York Giants in a game against the Cubs, 19-year-old Fred Merkle committed a base-running error that later became known as "Merkle's Boner" and earned him the nickname of "Bonehead."

In the bottom of the 9th inning, Merkle came to bat with two outs and the score tied 1–1.  At the time, Moose McCormick was on first base.  Merkle singled, and McCormick advanced to third. Al Bridwell followed with another single, and McCormick trotted home to score the apparent winning run.  The New York fans in attendance, under the impression that the game was over, ran onto the field to celebrate.

Meanwhile, Merkle, thinking the game was over, ran to the Giants' clubhouse without touching second base (a gesture that was common at the time).  Cubs second baseman Johnny Evers noticed this, and after retrieving a ball and touching second base, he appealed to umpire Hank O'Day to call Merkle out.  Since Merkle had not touched the base, the umpire called him out on a force play, and McCormick's run did not count. The run was therefore nullified, the Giants' victory erased, and the score of the game remained tied.

Unfortunately, the thousands of fans on the field (as well as the growing darkness in the days before large electric light rigs made night games possible) prevented resumption of the game, and the game was declared a tie.  The Giants and the Cubs would end the season tied for first place and would have a rematch at the Polo Grounds on October 8.  The Cubs won this makeup game, 4–2, and thus the National League pennant.

Season standings

Record vs. opponents

Notable transactions 
 May 29, 1908: Doc Marshall was purchased by the Cubs from the St. Louis Cardinals.

Roster

Player stats

Batting

Starters by position 
Note: Pos = Position; G = Games played; AB = At bats; H = Hits; Avg. = Batting average; HR = Home runs; RBI = Runs batted in

Other batters 
Note: G = Games played; AB = At bats; H = Hits; Avg. = Batting average; HR = Home runs; RBI = Runs batted in

Pitching

Starting pitchers 
Note: G = Games pitched; IP = Innings pitched; W = Wins; L = Losses; ERA = Earned run average; SO = Strikeouts

Other pitchers 
Note: G = Games pitched; IP = Innings pitched; W = Wins; L = Losses; ERA = Earned run average; SO = Strikeouts

Relief pitchers 
Note: G = Games pitched; W = Wins; L = Losses; SV = Saves; ERA = Earned run average; SO = Strikeouts

1908 World Series 

NL Chicago Cubs (4) vs AL Detroit Tigers (1)

Notes

Inline citations

References

References 
1908 Chicago Cubs season at Baseball Reference

Chicago Cubs seasons
National League champion seasons
World Series champion seasons
Chicago Cubs season
Chicago Cubs